The 2003 Dodge/Save Mart 350 was the 16th stock car race of the 2003 NASCAR Winston Cup Series season and the 15th iteration of the event. The race was held on Sunday, June 22, 2003, in Sonoma, California, at the club layout in Infineon Raceway, a  permanent road course layout. The race took the scheduled 110 laps to complete. At race's end, Robby Gordon of Richard Childress Racing would win under caution, but not before making a controversial pass racing back to the line against eventual third-place finisher, teammate Kevin Harvick on lap 71 that sealed Gordon's victory. The win was Gordon's second career NASCAR Winston Cup Series win and his first of the season. To fill out the podium, Jeff Gordon of Hendrick Motorsports would finish second.

Background 

Infineon Raceway is one of two road courses to hold NASCAR races, the other being Watkins Glen International. The Chute was only used for NASCAR events such as this race, and was criticized by many drivers, who preferred the full layout.

Entry list

Practice

First practice 
The first practice would occur on Friday, June 20, at 11:20 AM PST, and would last for two hours.

Second practice 
The second practice would occur on Saturday, June 21, at 9:30 AM PST and would last for 45 minutes.

Third and final practice 
The third and final practice session, sometimes referred to as Happy Hour, would occur on Saturday, June 21, at 11:10 AM PST and would last for 45 minutes.

Qualifying 
Qualifying was held on Friday, June 20, at 3:05 PM PST. Drivers would each have one lap to set a lap time. Positions 1-36 would be decided on time, while positions 37-43 would be based on provisionals. Six spots are awarded by the use of provisionals based on owner's points. The seventh is awarded to a past champion who has not otherwise qualified for the race. If no past champ needs the provisional, the next team in the owner points will be awarded a provisional.

Two incidents would occur during the session. First, Jimmie Johnson would spin in Turn 10, forcing him to use a provisional. Then, Ricky Craven would blow an engine, also forcing him to use a provisional.

Four drivers would fail to qualify: P. J. Jones, Paul Menard, Jim Inglebright, and Brandon Ash.

Full qualifying results

Race results

References 

2003 NASCAR Winston Cup Series
NASCAR races at Sonoma Raceway
June 2003 sports events in the United States
2003 in sports in California